Water polo events at the 2017 World Aquatics Championships were held between 16 and 29 July 2017 in Budapest, Hungary.

Schedule
Two competitions were held.

All time are local (UTC+2).

Medal summary

Medal table

Medal events

References

External links
Official website
Records and statistics (reports by Omega)

 
Water polo
2017
2017
World Aquatics Championships